Shooting at the 1984 Summer Olympics took place at Prado Olympic Shooting Park, Chino, California, United States. The games marked the first time that women’s shooting events were included in the Olympic program.

Medal count

Medalists

Men's events

Women's events

Mixed events

Participating nations
A total of 460 shooters, 382 men and 77 women, from 68 nations competed at the Los Angeles Games:

See also
 Shooting at the Friendship Games

References

External links
Official Olympic Report

 
1984 Summer Olympics events
1984
Olympics
Shooting competitions in the United States